The Best of Andrea Bocelli: Vivere is the first greatest hits album released by Italian pop tenor Andrea Bocelli. It includes five new studio recordings and was internationally released by Sugar on 22 October 2007.

The song "Vive Ya", (Spanish version of "Dare to live (Vivere)") was nominated for Record of the Year at the Latin Grammy Awards of 2008. In August 2010, 3 years after its release, the album topped the charts in Poland.

The Spanish version of the album is named Lo Mejor de Andrea Bocelli: Vivire. In Japan the album was released on 19 March 2008 as Time to Say Goodbye: Bocelli Super Best and included two bonus tracks.

Track listing

 "La Voce Del Silenzio" (The Voice of Silence) - 4:55
 "Sogno" (Dream) - 4:00
 "Il mare calmo della sera" (The Calm Sea of the Evening) - 4:39
 "Dare to live (Vivere)" (feat. Laura Pausini) - 4:18
 "Canto della Terra" (Song of the Earth) - 3:59
 "A Te" (To You, feat. Kenny G) - 4:09
 "Bésame Mucho" (Kiss Me A Lot) - 4:02
 "Mille Lune Mille Onde" (A Thousand Moons, a Thousand Waves) - 3:59
 "Time to Say Goodbye" (Con te partirò)" (feat. Sarah Brightman) - 4:05
 "Io ci sarò" (I'll Be There, feat. Lang Lang) - 4:49
 "Romanza" (Romance) - 3:42
 "Vivo per lei" (I Live for Her, feat. Giorgia) - 4:25
 "Melodramma" - 4:07
 "Bellissime stelle" (Beautiful Stars) - 4:14
 "The Prayer" (feat. Celine Dion) - 4:27
 "Because We Believe"  (feat. Marco Borsato) - 4:40

Japan bonus tracks
  "Somos Novios (It's Impossible)" (feat. Rimi Natsukawa)
 "Dell'amore non si sa" (feat. Hayley Westenra)

Charts

Weekly charts

Year-end charts

Certifications

See also

 Vivere Live in Tuscany the  CD/DVD package of a pop concert for the album

Notes

External links
"The Best Of Andrea Bocelli: Vivere charts

Andrea Bocelli compilation albums
2007 greatest hits albums
Albums produced by David Foster
Decca Records compilation albums